Akodon aerosus, also known as the highland grass mouse or Yungas akodont, is a species of rodent in the family Cricetidae.
It is found in the eastern Andes from eastern Ecuador through Peru into central Bolivia.

References

Literature cited
Dunnum, J., Vargas, J., Bernal, N., Zeballos, H., Vivar, E. and Patterson, B. 2008. . In IUCN. IUCN Red List of Threatened Species. Version 2009.2. <www.iucnredlist.org>. Downloaded on April 2, 2010.
Musser, G.G. and Carleton, M.D. 2005. Superfamily Muroidea. Pp. 894–1531 in Wilson, D.E. and Reeder, D.M. (eds.). Mammal Species of the World: a taxonomic and geographic reference. 3rd ed. Baltimore: The Johns Hopkins University Press, 2 vols., 2142 pp. 

Akodon
Mammals of Bolivia
Mammals of Ecuador
Mammals of Peru
Mammals described in 1913
Taxonomy articles created by Polbot